In mathematics, Wedderburn's little theorem states that every finite domain is a field. In other words, for finite rings, there is no distinction between domains, division rings and fields.

The Artin–Zorn theorem generalizes the theorem to alternative rings: every finite alternative division ring is a field.

History 
The original proof was given by Joseph Wedderburn in 1905, who went on to prove it two other ways. Another proof was given by Leonard Eugene Dickson shortly after Wedderburn's original proof, and Dickson acknowledged Wedderburn's priority. On this basis, Parshall argues that Dickson should be credited with the first correct proof.

A simplified version of the proof was later given by Ernst Witt. Witt's proof is sketched below. Alternatively, the theorem is a consequence of the Skolem–Noether theorem by the following argument. Let  be a finite division algebra with center . Every maximal subfield of  has  elements; so they are isomorphic and thus are conjugate by Skolem–Noether.

A later "group-theoretic" proof was given by Ted Kaczynski in 1964.  This proof, Kaczynski's first published piece of mathematical writing, was a short, two-page note which also acknowledged the earlier historical proofs.

Relationship to the Brauer group of a finite field 
The theorem is essentially equivalent to saying that the Brauer group of a finite field is trivial. In fact, this characterization immediately yields a proof of the theorem as follows: let k be a finite field.

Proof 
Let A  be a finite domain. For each nonzero x in A, the two maps

are injective by the cancellation property, and thus, surjective by counting. It follows from the elementary group theory  that the nonzero elements of  form a group under multiplication. Thus,  is a skew-field.

To prove that every finite skew-field is a field, we use strong induction on the size of the skew-field. Our objective is then to show  .

In the polynomial identities

we set .
 divides both  and each ,

so by the above class equation  must divide , and therefore

To see that this forces  to be , we will show

for  using factorization over the complex numbers. In the polynomial identity

where  runs over the primitive -th roots of unity, set  to be  and then take absolute values

For , we see that for each primitive -th root of unity ,

Thus

Notes

References

External links 
Proof of Wedderburn's Theorem at Planet Math
 Mizar system proof: http://mizar.org/version/current/html/weddwitt.html#T38

Theorems in ring theory